Henry Whitely (18 June 1844, Woolwich - 11 July 1892 (or 1893), British Guiana) was an English naturalist and explorer. He was particularly interested in ornithology and entomology.

He made his first expedition to Japan in 1864, and the ornithological results were published in the Ibis. Later he collected birds in Peru, in Amazonia, and in British Guiana, 
where he resided mostly. 

Among his bird discoveries are: Oreonympha nobilis Gould, Lophornis pavoninus Salvin, Hylocharis guianensis Boucard, Uranomitra whitelyi Boucard, Amazilia cupreicauda Salvin, Aglaeactis caumatonata Gould, Iolaema whitelyana Gould, Hemistephania guianensis Boucard, Milornis rupuninii Boucard and Eretnita whitelyi Boucard. 

Besides bird skins he also made large collections of insects, chiefly Coleoptera and Lepidoptera, among which were many new species.

References

Boucard, Adolphe (1895). "Henry Whitely". The Humming Bird: A Quarterly Scientific, Artistic and Industrial Review. Band 5. Note: This source gives the date of death as "11th of July, 1893".
"Obituary: Henry Whitely". The Ibis. Band 5, Nr. 18, 1893, S. 287–288. Note: This source gives the date of death as "11th of July last year" (in April 1893).
Salvin, Osbert & Sclater, Philip (1869). "On Peruvian birds collected by Mr Whitely". Proceedings of the Zoological Society of London: 592–596.

 English entomologists
 English ornithologists
1892 deaths
1844 births